Meager or Meagre may refer to:
 Meagre set (also meager set) in mathematics
 Mount Meager (British Columbia) in British Columbia, Canada
 Mount Meager massif in British Columbia, Canada
 Meager Creek, a creek in British Columbia, Canada
 Meagre, Argyrosomus regius, a fish